Graham McDonald Gunn, AM (born 5 September 1942), was an Australian politician who was a member of the South Australian House of Assembly. A member of the Liberal Party, he represented the electorate of Eyre from 1970 to 1997, and the electorate of Stuart from 1997 to 2010. By the final years of his parliamentary career, Gunn had become the longest-serving member of any parliament in Australia.

After attending Adelaide's Scotch College, Gunn pursued a career as a farmer and grazier in the Mount Cooper area. He served on the Streaky Bay Council between 1966 and 1970.  In 1970, he was elected to the House of Assembly for Eyre, in South Australia's vast northern outback, as a member of the then Liberal and Country League (LCL), which became the South Australian division of the Liberal Party in 1974. Aged 27, he was one of the youngest politicians in Australia at the time.

Gunn served as Speaker of the South Australian House of Assembly from 1994 to 1997, during the Brown Liberal Government, but lost that office after John Olsen ascended to the Liberal leadership.

For most of his tenure, Gunn was re-elected with little difficulty.  However, before the 1997 state election, his old seat was abolished in a redistribution.  Gunn contested the electorate of Stuart, essentially the eastern half of his former seat.  While he went into the election sitting on a notional majority of eight percent, he suffered a 7.5 percent swing against him due to a vigorous Labor campaign. He also faced a strong challenge from Labor candidate Justin Jarvis in the 2006 state election, with the final result not being known until nine days after the election. Gunn ultimately emerged victorious, albeit by only 233 votes.

Gunn retired at the 2010 state election, having spent half of his life in the state parliament. He was the last surviving parliamentarian from the LCL, as well as the last parliamentary survivor of the Dunstan, Corcoran and Tonkin governments.  The Liberals pre-selected former national basketball player Dan van Holst Pellekaan to defend Stuart.

On Australia Day 2011, Gunn was appointed a Member of the Order of Australia.

References

External links
 
 

1942 births
Living people
Liberal Party of Australia members of the Parliament of South Australia
Members of the South Australian House of Assembly
Recipients of the Centenary Medal
Speakers of the South Australian House of Assembly
Members of the Order of Australia
People educated at Scotch College, Adelaide
Liberal and Country League politicians
21st-century Australian politicians